John David Coles is an American director and producer.

Coles was nominated in 2015 for an Emmy and PGA Award for his work as an Executive Producer and Director on the Netflix phenomenon, House of Cards.  Known for his recent directing credits on the Emmy Award-winning Showtime series Homeland, the Epix original series Berlin Station, 11/22/63 for Hulu, and Amazon’s Mad Dogs.

His production company, Talking Wall Pictures, has focused on the development of cutting-edge and writer-forward feature and television projects after securing a first round of equity financing in 2019.

Early life

Coles shot his first full length 16mm film at age 17 – a wry update of Casablanca (1942) re-imagined in a high school. While at Amherst College he directed a documentary about the school that was aired on PBS, and soon after was making short films for NBC’s Saturday Night Live and directing industrial films for AT&T and Pepsi-Cola.

Career

Coles began his career as an editor on Francis Ford Coppola’s Rumble Fish (1983) and The Cotton Club (1984). His feature directorial debut and break into the indie scene came in 1989 with the Beau Bridges and Vincent D’Onofrio starring, Signs of Life, which earned Coles the International Critics Prize at Deauville American Film Festival, France. This was followed by additional long form directing credits Rising Son (1990) starring Matt Damon and Brian Dennehy, and Darrow (1991) with Kevin Spacey.

In the theatre space, Coles was a member of the Circle Rep Lab and an alumnus of Wynn Handman at the American Place Theater. His Off-Broadway credits include directing the critically acclaimed play The Impostor (1986) starring Austin Pendleton and Calista Flockhart, as well as Johnny Suede (1987), starring Tom DiCillo.

Coles began directing episodic television in the 90s on titles such as William Tell (1987), I’ll Fly Away (1991), and Going to Extremes (1992). Since then, his directing credits have grown to include the Emmy Award-winning Homeland (2015), the Epix original series Berlin Station (2016), 11/22/63 for Hulu (2016), and Amazon’s Mad Dogs (2016). Other credits include Bates Motel (2014), Power (2014), Damages (2007), Justified (2011), Sex and the City (1999-2002), and The West Wing (2002-2003).

Executive Producer credits include Thief (2006), Elementary (2013), Unforgettable (2012), 3 lbs. (2006), Law and Order: Criminal Intent (2012), New Amsterdam (2008), Wonderland (2000), and most recently, USA’s hit drama The Sinner (2018).

In 2015, Coles was nominated for an Emmy and PGA Award for his work as an Executive Producer and Director on the Netflix phenomenon, House of Cards (2015). 

Coles continues to write and create original dramas through Talking Wall Pictures, which produced the CBS drama Songs in Ordinary Time (2000) (based on the Oprah Book Club pick) starring Sissy Spacek and Beau Bridges and co-created and executive produced the series Crash and Burn (2009).  Talking Wall has developed numerous projects with HBO, CBS, New Line, IFC, Bravo and worked with numerous distinguished writers, including Academy Award nominated Mike Weller (Hair), Pulitzer Prize winner Doug Wright (Quills), Kate Robin (Six Feet Under) and Ann Peacock (Nights in Rodanthe).

Personal life
Coles lives in New York with his wife Laura. He is a Sundance Director’s Lab Alumni and has taught at the Columbia University Graduate Film Program, NYU Tisch School of the Arts, and the School of Visual Arts.

Directing credits
Law & Order: Organized Crime (2021)
episode 1.03 "Say Hello To My Little Friends"
The Right Stuff (2020)
episode 1.02 "Goodies"
FBI: Most Wanted (2020)
episode 1.12 "Ride or Die"
The Sinner (2018)
episode 2.03 "Part III"
episode 2.08 "Part VIII"
Mr. Mercedes (2017)
episode 1.03 "Cloudy, With a Chance Of Mayhem"
The Son (2017)
episode 1.08 "Honey Hunt"
Shots Fired (2017)
episode 1.07 "Hour Seven: Content Of Their Character"
Berlin Station (2016)
Mad Dogs (2016)
11.22.63 (2016)
Homeland (2015)
House of Cards (2014)
episode 2.5 "Chapter 18"
episode 2.6 "Chapter 19"
episode 2.11 "Chapter 24"
episode 3.1 "Chapter 27"
episode 3.2 "Chapter 28"
Trump Unauthorized (2005) (TV) 
Grey's Anatomy (2005) TV Series
episode 1.05 "Shake Your Groove Thing"
Desperate Housewives (2004) TV Series 
episode 1.11 "Move On"
Jack & Bobby (2004) TV Series 
episode 1.06 "Valentino"
Karen Sisco (2003) TV Series 
episode 1.04 "Justice"
Push, Nevada (2002) TV Series 
The American Embassy (2002) TV Series  
Law & Order: Criminal Intent (2001) TV Series 
episode 1.10 "Enemy Within"
The $treet (2000) TV Series 
Wonderland (2000) TV Series 
The West Wing (1999) TV Series 
episode 4.10 "Arctic Radar"
episode 4.21 "Life On Mars"
Maximum Bob (1998) TV Series 
Sex and the City (1998) TV Series  
episode 2.06 "The Cheating Curve"
episode 3.13 "Escape from New York"
episode 3.14 "Sex and Another City"
episode 5.03 "Luck Be An Old Lady"
episode 5.04 "Cover Girl"
Nothing Sacred (1997) TV Series 
Feds (1997) TV Series 
New York News (1995) TV Series 
Friends at Last (1995) (TV) 
Against Her Will: The Carrie Buck Story (1994) (TV) 
Birdland (1994) TV Series 
Philly Heat (1994) TV Series 
The Good Fight (1992) (TV) 
I'll Fly Away (1991) TV Series 
Darrow (1991) (TV) 
Rising Son (1990/I) (TV) 
Northern Exposure (1990) TV Series 
Signs of Life (1989)  
Crossbow (1988) TV Series

External links

American film directors
American television directors
Year of birth missing (living people)
Living people